Mongkol Borey is a district (srok) in the south of Banteay Meanchey Province, in northwestern Cambodia. The district capital is the town of Mongkol Borey, around nine kilometres south of the provincial capital of Serei Saophoan by road. The district shares a border with Battambang Province to the south. The main railway line from Phnom Penh to Poipet on the border with Thailand runs through the district from north to south.

The district is easily accessed by road from Serei Saophoan (9 km) Battambang (60 km), and Siem Reap (110 km). Mongkol Borey district is one of the smallest districts in Banteay Meanchey Province by area and only Serei Saophoan Municipality is smaller. However, it has the largest district population in the province due to its central location and transport infrastructure. National Highway 5 which begins in Phnom Penh and ends at Poipet and the National railway bisect the district in parallel running from north to south. National road 160 begins near the centre of the district and runs southwest into Pailin.

History 
 

The history of Mongkol Borey District before the 18th century is unclear, although it is likely that it was part of Battambang province. However, the first record of the city was first mentioned in the chronicle of Rama III of Siam that the city was established in 1833 and was first assigned to Ang Duang. From the 18th century until 1907, it was part of Phra Tabong province of Thailand. At that time the Siamese controlled the area that is modern Banteay Meanchey, Oddar Meanchey, Siem Reap, Pailin and Battambang Provinces. Under the French-Siamese treaty of 23 March 1907, these parts of Cambodia were returned. At this time the area around Serei Sophorn was part of Serei Sophorn District of Battambang. Between 1925 and 1940 a number of new Battambang districts were created, including Mongkol Borey. In 1988 the five northern districts of Battambang were separated to form the new province of Banteay Meanchey.

It is the birthplace of King Sisowath (then part of Battambang province) who was King of Cambodia from 1904 to 1927.

Location 
Mongkol Borey district lies in the south of the province and shares a border with Battambang Province. From the north clockwise, Mongkol Borey borders Serei Saophoan District to the north. The eastern border of the district is shared with Preah Netr Preah district. The Mongkol Borey River forms part of the eastern district boundary towards Preah Netr Preah. To the south the district shares a border with Thmor Koal and Bavel Districts of Battambang Province. The western border of the district joins with Malai and Ou Chrov Districts of Banteay Meanchey.

Administration 
The Mongkol Borey district governor is Roth Dasinong, who works under the administration of Oum Reatrey, the Governor of Banteay Meanchey Province. The following table shows the villages of Mongkol Borey District by commune.

Economy 
Mongkol Borey is one of the largest agricultural districts in Banteay Meanchey Province. The majority of the population work as farmers and the remainder run small businesses, work for the government and other private institutions. Due to its geographical advantage, trading with the neighboring country, Thailand, also plays an important role in the district. Most larger businesses in the district are controlled by Chinese Cambodians including jewelry stores, rice mills, and other trading stores in the markets. Some people also do business with the Thais at Rong Kluea Market, which is the border trade market between Cambodia and Thailand. Due to the instability of farming, job seeking and aiming to improve the living condition have forced some of the population to flee hometown to the larger cities like Phnom Penh and Siem Reap for employment and schooling.

Demographics 
The district is subdivided into 13 communes (khum) and 157 villages (phum). According to the 1998 Census, the population of the district was 138,190 persons in 25,754 households in 1998. This population consisted of 67,821 males (49.1%) and 70,369 females (50.9%). With a population of over 130,000 people, Mongkol Borey has by far the largest district populations in Banteay Meanchey Province. The average household size in Mongkol Borey is 5.4 persons per household, which is slightly larger than the rural average for Cambodia (5.2 persons). The sex ratio in the district is 96.4%, with slightly more females than males.

References

External links
Banteay Meanchey at Royal Government of Cambodia website
Banteay Meanchey at the Ministry of Commerce website

Districts of Banteay Meanchey province